Jamal Hairane (born 26 May 1993) is a Moroccan-born Qatari athlete specialising in the 800 metres events. He won the Bronze medal at the 2014 Asian Games.

His personal bests in the event are 1:46.16 outdoors (Leuven 2015) and 1:48.05 indoors (Doha 2015). He is also known as Jamal Al-Hayrani.

Competition record

References

1993 births
Living people
Qatari male middle-distance runners
Asian Games medalists in athletics (track and field)
Athletes (track and field) at the 2014 Asian Games
Athletes (track and field) at the 2018 Asian Games
World Athletics Championships athletes for Qatar
Asian Games bronze medalists for Qatar
Medalists at the 2014 Asian Games
Moroccan emigrants to Qatar